Allen Froese is a Canadian contemporary Christian singer and songwriter. He is most noted for his 2019 EP All Things New, which was a Juno Award nominee for Contemporary Christian/Gospel Album of the Year at the Juno Awards of 2021.

He previously released the album Faith Inside in 2007, and the EP We Won't Stop in 2015.

References

External links

Canadian performers of Christian music
Living people
21st-century Canadian male singers
Year of birth missing (living people)